This is a list of nationwide and statewide public opinion polls that have been conducted relating to the Republican primaries for the 2020 United States presidential election. The persons named in the polls are declared candidates or have received media speculation about their possible candidacy. The polls included are among Republicans or Republicans and Republican-leaning independents. If multiple versions of polls are provided, the version among likely voters is prioritized, then registered voters, then adults.

Background

National polling

From February 2020

From December 2019 to January 2020

June 2019 to November 2019

November 2018 to May 2019

Before November 2018

Against unnamed primary challenger

Statewide polling
The statewide polls are ordered by the scheduled date of the state's primary or caucus. Polls with a sample size of <100 have their 'sample size' cells marked in red to indicate a lack of reliability.

Iowa caucus
The Iowa Republican caucus will take place on Monday, February 3, 2020.

New Hampshire primary
The New Hampshire Republican primary will take place on Tuesday, February 11, 2020.

Since July 2019

Before May 2019

Against unnamed primary challenger

Nevada caucus
The Nevada caucus was cancelled by the Nevada Republican Party in a vote on September 7, 2019.

South Carolina primary
The South Carolina primary was cancelled in a vote by the South Carolina Republican Party on September 7, 2019.

Against unnamed primary challenger

California primary
The California Republican primary will take place on Tuesday, March 3, 2020.

Since June 2019

April 2019 to May 2019

Against unnamed primary challenger

Colorado primary
The Colorado Republican primary will take place on Tuesday, March 3, 2020.

Against unnamed primary challenger

Massachusetts primary
The Massachusetts Republican primary will take place on Tuesday, March 3, 2020.

North Carolina primary
The North Carolina Republican primary will take place on Tuesday, March 3, 2020.

Texas primary
The Texas Republican primary will take place on Tuesday, March 3, 2020.

Utah primary
The Utah Republican primary took place in Tuesday, March 3, 2020.

Against unnamed primary challenger

Vermont primary
The Vermont Republican primary took place on Tuesday, March 3, 2020.

Wyoming caucuses
The last presidential cycle's Wyoming caucuses took place on March 1 in 2016 and would, if scheduled for Super Tuesday in 2020, take place on March 3, 2020. Instead, the Wyoming Republican state convention was scheduled for May 9, 2020.

Michigan primary
The Michigan Republican primary took place on Tuesday, March 10, 2020.

Illinois primary
The Illinois Republican primary took place on Tuesday, March 17, 2020.

Ohio primary
The Ohio Republican primary will take place on Tuesday, March 10, 2020.

Florida primary
The Florida Republican primary will take place on Tuesday, March 17, 2020.

Against unnamed primary challenger

Wisconsin primary
The Wisconsin Republican primary will take place on Tuesday, April 7, 2020.

Arizona primary
The Arizona 2016 Republican primary was held on March 22, 2016, but the 2020 primary was cancelled on September 9, 2019.

Delaware primary
The Delaware Republican primary will take place on Tuesday, April 28, 2020.

Maryland primary
The Maryland Republican primary will take place on Tuesday, April 28, 2020.

Pennsylvania primary
The Pennsylvania Republican primary will take place on Tuesday, April 28, 2020.

Montana primary

New Jersey primary

New Mexico primary

See also
2020 Republican National Convention
Nationwide opinion polling for the 2020 Democratic Party presidential primaries
Statewide opinion polling for the 2020 Democratic Party presidential primaries
Nationwide opinion polling for the 2020 United States presidential election
Statewide opinion polling for the 2020 United States presidential election

Notes

References

External links
Primary poll tracker from FiveThirtyEight

2020 United States Republican presidential primaries
Republican Party